Garra festai is a species of ray-finned fish in the family Cyprinidae. The species is endemic to the Aammiq Wetland in 
Lebanon.

References

Fish described in 1939
Cyprinid fish of Asia
Garra